The Cincinnati Reds' 1983 season was a season in American baseball. It consisted of the Cincinnati Reds attempting to win the National League West.  It was Johnny Bench's last season as a Red.

Offseason 
 October 15, 1982: Ted Power was acquired by the Reds from the Los Angeles Dodgers for Mike Ramsey and cash.
 November 15, 1982: Clint Hurdle was released by the Reds.
 December 16, 1982: Tom Seaver was traded by the Reds to the New York Mets for Charlie Puleo, Lloyd McClendon, and Jason Felice (minors).
 January 11, 1983: Tracy Jones was drafted by the Reds in the 1st round (1st pick) of the secondary phase of the 1983 Major League Baseball Draft.
 January 20, 1983: Danny Tartabull was chosen from the Reds by the Seattle Mariners as a free agent compensation pick.
 March 31, 1983: Bill Dawley and Tony Walker were traded by the Reds to the Houston Astros for Alan Knicely.

Regular season

Season standings

Record vs. opponents

Notable transactions 
 May 9, 1983: Rafael Landestoy was traded by the Reds to the Los Angeles Dodgers for John Franco and Brett Wise (minors).
 June 6, 1983: 1983 Major League Baseball Draft
Chris Sabo was drafted by the Reds in the 2nd round.
Joe Oliver was drafted by the Reds in the 2nd round.
 June 30, 1983: Wayne Krenchicki was traded by the Reds to the Detroit Tigers for Pat Underwood.
 September 27, 1983: Greg Harris was selected off waivers from the Reds by the Montreal Expos.

Roster

Player stats

Batting

Starters by position 
Note: Pos = Position; G = Games played; AB = At bats; H = Hits; Avg. = Batting average; HR = Home runs; RBI = Runs batted in

Other batters 
Note: G = Games played; AB = At bats; H = Hits; Avg. = Batting average; HR = Home runs; RBI = Runs batted in

Pitching

Starting pitchers 
Note: G = Games pitched; IP = Innings pitched; W = Wins; L = Losses; ERA = Earned run average; SO = Strikeouts

Other pitchers 
Note: G = Games pitched; IP = Innings pitched; W = Wins; L = Losses; ERA = Earned run average; SO = Strikeouts

Relief pitchers 
Note: G = Games pitched; W = Wins; L = Losses; SV = Saves; ERA = Earned run average; SO = Strikeouts

Farm system 

LEAGUE CHAMPIONS: Billings

Notes

References 
1983 Cincinnati Reds season at Baseball Reference

Cincinnati Reds seasons
Cincinnati Reds season
Cinc